The vice-president of Ghana is the second-highest officer in the Government of Ghana. The vice-president, together with the President of Ghana, is directly elected by the people through popular vote to serve a four-year term in office. The vice-president is the first person in the presidential line of succession, and would ascend to the presidency upon the death, resignation, or removal of the president. The current vice-president is Mahamudu Bawumia, who took office on 7 January 2017, under President Nana Akufo-Addo.

Eligibility
The provisions of article 62 of the 1992 Constitution apply to a candidate for election as Vice-President. The candidate must be:

(a) a citizen of Ghana by birth
(b) attained the age of thirty-five years or above
(c) be otherwise qualified to be elected a Member of Parliament, except that the disqualifications set out in paragraphs (c), (d), and (e) of clause (2) of article 94 of this Constitution shall not be removed, in respect of any such person, by a presidential pardon or by the lapse of time as provided for in clause (5) of that article.

The president and vice president are elected on a single ticket; all presidential candidates must lodge the name of their running mate when filing for election.

If the president dies, resigns, or is permanently incapacitated, the vice-president automatically ascends as president for the balance of the term. A Vice-President who ascends to the presidency before half of the presidential term expires is only allowed to run for a single full term. If more than half of the term has expired, he can run for two terms, whether successive or separated. This provision has been used once, when John Mahama ascended to the presidency after the death of his running mate, John Atta Mills, in July 2012. He was elected president in his own right that December, and was allowed to run for reelection in 2016 since he had ascended with only six months remaining in Mills' term.

Oath of office 
The Vice-President of Ghana must be sworn in by the Chief Justice before the citizens of Ghana at the Independence square in Accra. The Vice-President-elect must repeat the following:

"I,(name) having been elected to the office of Vice-President of the Republic of Ghana, do (in the name of the Almighty God swear) (solemnly affirm) that I will be faithful and true to the Republic of Ghana; that I will at all times preserve, protect and defend the Constitution of the Republic of Ghana; and I dedicate myself to the service and well-being of the people of the Republic of Ghana and to do right to all manner of persons.

I further (solemnly swear) (solemnly affirm) that should I at any time break this oath of office, I shall submit myself to the laws of the Republic of Ghana and suffer the penalty for it. (So help me God)."

Duties
The duties of the vice-president of Ghana are:
 presiding of various meetings in absence of the President
 acting President when the president is out of the country

The Vice-President is also a member of 
 The National Security Council
 The Armed Forces Council
 The Police Service Council
 The Prisons Service Council

List of vice-presidents of Ghana (1979–present)

Demographics

References

 
Ghana, Vice Presidents of